Archduchess Sophie of Austria (5 March 185529 May 1857) was the first child of Emperor Franz Joseph I and Empress Elisabeth of Austria. She died aged two.

Life
Within two months of her marriage to Franz Joseph, Elisabeth was pregnant. On 5 March 1855, the 17-year-old Empress of Austria delivered a daughter who was christened the same day, without Elisabeth's knowledge, Sophie Friederike Dorothea Maria Josepha, after Franz Joseph's mother.  On both her mother and her father's side, Sophie descended from King Maximilian I Joseph of Bavaria, as her parents were first cousins. On her father's side, she descended from the last Holy Roman Emperor, Francis II. During the next year, Elisabeth delivered another daughter, Archduchess Gisela, a younger sister to Sophie. Although they were both girls and did not need to be educated for duties a monarch would be obliged to fulfill, both infants right after being baptised were taken away from Elisabeth by Archduchess Sophie (who was both Elisabeth's aunt and mother-in-law) on account of the Empress being too young to raise two children. Elisabeth later commented:

No matter how long Elisabeth begged Franz Joseph to discuss the matter with his mother, her cries went unheard. Eventually, Franz Joseph did discuss the problem with his mother and Elisabeth eventually began to openly express her wishes to her mother-in-law and even took the little girls with her as she travelled.

Death

Empress Elisabeth adored Hungary and its people and proposed to her husband that they take a trip to her favourite country, perhaps even tour it. Franz Joseph accepted and they left in early spring 1857. While in Budapest, both Sophie and her sister Archduchess Gisela fell ill with diarrhea and had a very high fever. 10-month-old Gisela recovered quickly. However, two-year-old Sophie died in her mother's arms at : in the evening, after eleven hours of struggling to survive, probably from dehydration due to the diarrhea or from convulsions due to the high fever. It was later theorized that Sophie died from typhus fever, but this is yet to be proven.

Aftermath
Sophie's body was brought back to Vienna and buried in the Imperial Crypt, in Ferdinandsgruft (Ferdinand's Vault) within the southwest pier.

The death of her oldest child would haunt Empress Elisabeth for her entire life. Elisabeth was held indirectly responsible for Sophie's death by her mother-in-law Archduchess Sophie (née Princess Sophie of Bavaria). She suffered a breakdown and would lock herself in her apartments for days at a time or go riding until she reached a state of exhaustion, just to avoid having to think. Sophie's death also settled who got the children. Princess Sophie indisputably took the children as soon as they were born. Elisabeth also started to neglect her surviving daughter, and their relationship was not a close one. One of Elisabeth's ladies-in-waiting, Marie Festetics, commented in her diary that the Empress did not even take the time to attend Gisela's wedding preparations. Elisabeth also behaved in a similar manner to her only son, Rudolf, Crown Prince of Austria. For the rest of her remaining days, Elisabeth would wear a bracelet with a likeness of her dead daughter and kept a portrait of her in her apartments.

Gallery

Ancestry

References

Bibliography

External links

Archduchess Sophie at GeneAll.com

1855 births
1857 deaths
Austrian princesses
House of Habsburg-Lorraine
Deaths from typhus
Franz Joseph I of Austria
Daughters of emperors
Burials at the Imperial Crypt
Royalty and nobility who died as children
Daughters of kings